Gleneagles Global Hospitals (formerly Global Hospitals Group) is a hospital network based in India.

History 
Global Hospitals Group was founded by Dr. K. Ravindranath in 1999 with a focus on complex multi-organ transplantation. The hospital has achieved several milestones by performing pioneering surgeries like India's first successful Split & Auxiliary Liver Transplant, and the first combined Heart & Kidney transplant.

In August 2015, IHH Healthcare announced the acquisition of 73.4 per cent stake in Hyderabad-based GE Medical Associates Pvt Ltd, which had hospitals under the brand Global Hospitals, by investing Rs 1,280 crores. IHH Healthcare Berhad consolidated its Indian platform by rebranding Global Hospitals under the brand Gleneagles.

Future expansion 
In March 2017, Gleneagles Global Hospitals announced plans to invest ₹200 crore to grow its market presence. The planned expansion included increasing overall bed capacity from 1,400 beds to 2,100 beds within two years, and establishing a presence in Delhi.

The India operations are led by Dr. K. Ravindranath, Chairman, Gleneagles Global Hospitals and Ramesh Krishnan, Chief Executive Officer, India Operations Division, Parkway Pantai Limited. In April 2018, Parkway Pantai announced the appointment of Dr Ajay Bakshi as the Chief Executive Officer – Designate for its India Operations Division.

Hospitals 
 Aware Gleneagles Global Hospitals, LB Nagar, Hyderabad
 Gleneagles Global Hospitals, Lakdi-ka-pul, Hyderabad
 Gleneagles Global Health City, Perumbakkam, Chennai
 Gleneagles Global Clinics, Adyar, Chennai
 BGS Gleneagles Global Hospitals, Kengeri, Bengaluru
 Gleneagles Global Hospitals, Richmond Road, Bengaluru
 Global Hospitals, Parel, Mumbai

See also 

 Healthcare in India
 List of hospitals in India
Gleneagles Hospital (disambiguation)

References

External links 
 

Hospital networks in India